Charles Underhill may refer to:

 Charles L. Underhill (1867–1946), U.S. Representative and anti-suffrage activist
 Charles Edward Underhill (1845–1908), Scottish physician and sportsman